The latrunculins are a family of natural products and toxins produced by certain sponges, including genus Latrunculia and Negombata, whence the name is derived. It binds actin monomers near the nucleotide binding cleft with 1:1 stoichiometry and prevents them from polymerizing. Administered in vivo, this effect results in disruption of the actin filaments of the cytoskeleton, and allows visualization of the corresponding changes made to the cellular processes. This property is similar to that of cytochalasin, but has a narrow effective concentration range. Latrunculin has been used to great effect in the discovery of cadherin distribution regulation and has potential medical applications. Latrunculin A, a type of the toxin, was found to be able to make reversible morphological changes to mammalian cells by disrupting the actin network.

Latrunculin A:

Target and functions

Gelsolin - Latrunculin A causes end- blocking; this protein binds to the barbed sides of the actin filaments which accelerates nucleation. This calcium-regulated protein also plays a role in assembly and disassembly of cilia which plays a crucial role in handedness.

Latrunculin B:

Target and Function

Actin- Latrunculin B makes up the structure of the actin fibers.

Protein spire homolog 2- needed for cell division, vesicle transport within the actin filament and is essential for the formation of the cleavage formation during cell division[4].

History 
Latrunculin is a toxin that is produced by sponges. The red-coloured Latrunculia Magnifica Keller is an abundant sponge in the gulf of Eilat and the gulf of Suez in the red sea, where it lives at a depth of 6–30 meters. The toxin was discovered around 1970. Researchers observed that the red-coloured sponges, Latrunculia Magnifica Keller, were never damaged or eaten by fishes, while others were. Furthermore, when researchers squeezed the sponges in the sea, they observed that a red fluid came out. Fishes nearby immediately fled the surrounding area when the sponge secreted the fluid. These were the first indications that these sponges produced a toxin. Later this hypothesis was confirmed by squeezing the sponge in an aquarium with fish, whereupon the fish showed a loss of balance and severe bleeding, dying within only 4–6 minutes. Similar effects were observed when the toxin was injected in mice.

Latrunculin makes up to 0.35% of the dry weight of the sponge. There are two main forms of the toxin, A and B. Latrunculin A is only present in sponges which live in the gulf of Suez while latrunculin B only exist in sponges in the gulf of Eilat. Why this is the case is still under investigation.

Structure 

There are several isomers of latrunculin, A, B, C, D, G, H, M, S and T. The most common structures are latrunculin A and B. Their formulas are respectively C22H31NO5S and C20H29NO5S. The macrolactone ring on top that contains double bonds is a structural feature of the latrunculin molecules. The side chain contains an acylthiazolidinone substitute. Besides these natural occurring forms, scientist have made synthetic forms with different toxic strengths. Figure 2 shows some of these forms with their relative ability to disrupt microfilament activity. Semisynthetic forms that contained N-alkylated derivates were inactive.

Mechanism of action 
Latrunculin A and latrunculin B affect polymerization of actin. Latrunculin binds actin monomers near the nucleotide binding cleft with 1:1 stoichiometry and prevents them from polymerizing. The nucleotide monomers are prevented from dissociation from the nucleotide binding cleft, thus preventing polymerizing.

Experimental evidence shows that latruculin-A is biologically active in the solvent DMSO, but not in aqueous solutions, as demonstrated in cell culture and in brain tissue probably due to cellular permeation.

When actin is impaired due to latrunculin, Shiga toxins have a better chance of infiltrating the intestinal epithelial monolayer in E. coli, which may cause a higher chance of generating gastrointestinal illnesses.

It seems that actin monomers are more sensitive to bind latrunculin A than to bind Latrunculin B. In other words, latrunculin A is a more potent toxin. Latrunculin B is inactivated faster than latrunculin A.

The prevention of polymerizing of the actin filaments causes reversible changes in the morphology of mammalian cells. Lantranculin interferes with the structure of the cytoskeleton in rats.

After latrunculin B exposure, mouse fibroblasts grow bigger and PtK2 kidney cells from a potoroo stem produced long, branched extensions. The extensions seem to be an accumulation of actin monomers.

Metabolism 
Yeast cells in absence of the proteins osh3 or osh5 demonstrated hypersensitivity to latrunculin B. The osh proteins are homologous to OSBP generated enzymes that appear in mammals, indicating that these might play a role in the toxicokinetics of latrunculins.

Yeast mutants that are resistant to latrunculin show a mutation, D157E, that initiates a hydrogen bond with latrunculin. Other yeast mutants adjust the binding site, thus making it resistant to latrunculin.

No research has been done to figure out how the biotransformation of latrunculin works in eukaryotic cells. However, research suggests that it is the unaltered form of latrunculin that causes toxic effects.

Toxicity 
As latrunculin inhibits actin polymerization and actomyosin contractile ability, exposure to latrunculin may result in cellular relaxation, expansion of drainage tissues and decreased outflow resistance in e.g. the trabecular meshwork.

Plant 
Latrunculin B causes marked and dose-dependent reductions in pollen germination frequency and pollen tube growth rate.

Adding latrunculin B to solutions of pollen F-actin produced a rapid decrease in the total amount of polymer, the extent of depolymerization increasing with the concentrations of the toxic. The concentration of latrunculin B required for half-maximal inhibition of pollen germination is 40 to 50 nM, whereas pollen tube extension is much more sensitive, requiring only 5 to 7 nM LATB for half-maximal inhibition. The disruption of germination and pollen tube growth by latrunculin B is partially reversible at low concentrations. (<30 nM).

Animal 
Squeezing Latrunculia magnifica into aquarium with fishes causes their almost immediate agitation, followed by hemorrhage, loss of balance and death in 4–6 minutes.

Latrunculin A has been used as acrosome reaction inhibitor of guinea pig in laboratory conditions.

Human 
Lat-A-induces reduction of actomyosin contractility. This is associated with trabecular meshwork porous expansion without evidence of reduced structural extracellular matrix protein expression or cellular viability. In high doses, latrunculin can induce acute cell injury and programmed cell death through activating the caspase-3/7 pathway.

Lethal doses 
TDLO - Lowest Published Toxic Dose

LD50 – median Lethal Dose

Applications 
In nature, latrunculins are used by the sponges themselves as a defense mechanism, and for the same purpose are also sequestered by certain nudibranchs.

Latrunculins are produced for fundamental research and have potential medical applications as latrunculins and their derivatives show antiangionic, antiproliferative, antimicrobial and antimetastatic activities.

Defense mechanism 
Like many other sessile organisms, sponges are rich of secondary metabolites with toxic properties and most of them, including Latrunculin, have a defense role against predators, competitors and epibionts.

The sponges themselves are not damaged by latrunculin. As a measure against self-toxination, they keep the latrunculin in membrane-bound vacuoles, that also function as secretory and storage vesicles. These vacuoles are free of actin and prevent the latrunculin from entering the cytosol where it would damage actin. After production in the choanocytes, the latrunculin is transferred via the archeocytes to the vulnerable areas of the sponges where defense is needed, such as injured or regenerating sites.

Sequestering by nudibranchs 
Sea slugs of the genus Chromodoris sequester different toxics from the sponges that they eat as defensive metabolites, including latrunculin. They selectively transfer and store latrunculin in the sites of the mantle that are most exposed to potential predators. It is thought that the digestive system of the nudibranchs plays an important role in the detoxification.

In 2015, the discovery that five closely related sea slugs of the genus Chromodoris all use latrunculin as defense, indicates that the toxic might be used via Müllerian mimicry.

Research 
Latrunculins are used for fundamental research like cytoskeleton studies. Many functions of actin have been determined by using latrunculins to block actin polymerization followed by examining the effects on the cell. Using this method, the importance of actin for the polarized localization of proteins, polarized exocytosis and the maintenance of cell polarity have been shown.  

In the field of Neuroscience, latrunculin has been used to demonstrate the role of actin in regulating voltage-gated ion channels in different nerve cells, showing that latrunculin treatment can alter the electrical activity of nerve cells. Latrunculin shows a dose-dependent inhibition of K+ currents and acute application can induce the firing of multiple action potentials , which could underlie a mechanism of defense via nociceptors. In addition, latrunculin-A was used to demonstrate the role of dentritic spine neck shrinkage for the induction of synaptic plasticity.

Medical applications 
Latrunculin A and B and derivatives have potential as novel chemotherapeutic agents. The potential use of latrunculin as growth inhibitors of tumor cells has already been investigated for certain forms of gastric cancer, metastatic breast cancer and prostate tumors.  In lower doses, latrunculin can be used to decrease disaggregation and cell migration, thereby preventing invasive activities of tumor cells. In higher doses, latrunculin can induce acute cell injury and programmed cell death through activating the caspase-3/7 pathway, and thus be used to kill tumor cells. Latrunculin A and its 17-O-[N-(benzyl)carbamate ( suppress hypoxia-induced HIF-1 activation in T47D breast tumor cells.

Latrunculin also is a potential therapeutic for ocular hypertension and glaucoma. Latrunculin A and B are shown to disrupt the actin cytoskeleton of the trabecular meshwork that is important for regulating humor outflow resistance and thereby intraocular pressure. By cellular relaxation and loosened cell-cell junctions, latrunculin can increase humor outflow facility. The first human trial of lantruculin B as treatment of ocular hypertension and glaucoma showed significantly lower intraocular pressure in patients.

References 

Actin inhibitors
Heterocyclic compounds with 2 rings
Lactones
Oxygen heterocycles
Thiazolidines